Admiral Sir Edward Desmond Bewley McCarthy,  (15 November 1893 – 8 June 1966) was a Royal Navy officer who went on to be Commander-in-Chief, South Atlantic Station.

Naval career
After the war he was appointed Rear Admiral, Destroyers in the Mediterranean Fleet and then Commander-in-Chief, South Atlantic Station from 1948. He retired in 1950.

Personal life
Despite having a Scottish surname he considered himself an Englishman, and always "referred to himself as an Englishman." He spoke fluent Latin and Italian, and thought of Italy as his favorite foreign country. He found Mussolini "horrifying" and hoped Mussolini would not damage what he felt was Italy's positive reputation. He was particularly disturbed by the lurid details he heard about Cesar More's occupation of Sicily. Many of his Italian friends in London were educators and pro-democracy activists who had to flee Italy due to the fascist regime. In 1925, McCarthy married Agatha Kentish, daughter of Brigadier General Horace John James Kentish. They had two sons.

References

1893 births
1966 deaths
Companions of the Distinguished Service Order
Knights Commander of the Order of the Bath
People from Hampstead
Royal Navy admirals of World War II
Royal Navy personnel of World War I
Military personnel from London